Coneyhurst is a hamlet in the Horsham District of West Sussex, England. It lies on the A272 road 1.6 miles (2.5 km) southeast of Billingshurst (where the 2011 population of the hamlet is included). It is named after the old words for "Rabbit - wood".

External links

Horsham District
Villages in West Sussex